Pyrola media, the intermediate wintergreen, is a flowering plant in the genus Pyrola, native to northern and eastern Europe and Western Asia.

It is a herbaceous evergreen perennial plant with a basal rosette of leaves and a single erect flowering stem 15–30 cm tall. The leaves are round, up to 4.5 cm diameter. The flowers are white or pale pink, 7–11 mm diameter, with a straight style extending beyond the petals.

The species is rare and declining in the British Isles.

References

media
Flora of Western Asia
Flora of Europe